Angélique or Anzhelika Abachkina (born 26 January 2000) is a Russian-French ice dancer. She currently skates with Pavel Drozd for Russia. With her former skating partner, Louis Thauron, she represented France at four World Junior Championships, finishing within the top ten at three editions (2015–2017).

Abachkina previously retired in October 2018 after the Fédération Française des Sports de Glace would not release her to skate with Drozd, but unretired in May 2021 after being released for the Figure Skating Federation of Russia.

Personal life 
Angélique Abachkina (pronounced /ˈɑːbɑʃkiːnɑː/) was born on 26 January 2000 in Krasnoyarsk, Russia. She arrived in France with her family when she was eight months old.

Career 
Abachkina began learning to skate in 2006. She teamed up with Louis Thauron in 2012. The duo debuted on the ISU Junior Grand Prix series in 2013, placing eighth in Estonia and tenth in Poland. In 2014, they were named in the French team for the World Junior Championships in Sofia, Bulgaria. Abachkina/Thauron placed 19th in the short dance, 15th in the free dance, and 18th overall. They were coached by Muriel Zazoui, Romain Haguenauer, Olivier Schoenfelder, and Diana Ribas in Lyon, France, during the 2013–14 season.

Abachkina/Thauron changed coaches prior to the 2014–2015 season, joining Igor Shpilband and Fabian Bourzat in Novi, Michigan. They placed seventh at both of their 2014 JGP events. Ranked eighth in the short dance and seventh in the free, they finished eighth overall at the 2015 World Junior Championships in Tallinn, Estonia.

Competing in the 2015 JGP series, Abachkina/Thauron won the silver medal in Riga, Latvia, and placed fourth in Zagreb, Croatia. They finished 7th at the 2016 World Junior Championships in Debrecen, Hungary.

In the 2016 JGP series, Abachkina/Thauron were awarded gold in Saint-Gervais-les-Bains, France, and bronze in Yokohama, Japan.

In July 2018, Alexander Zhulin began coaching the new partnership of Angelique Abachkina and Russia's Pavel Drozd, but the skaters parted ways after learning that the French federation would not release her to compete for Russia. On October 20, 2018, she decided to retire from competitive skating. She later unretired in 2021 after the French Federation decided to fulfill her request to transfer back to Russia, and she renewed her partnership with Drozd, coached by Zhulin.

Programs

with Drozd

with Thauron

Competitive highlights

With Drozd for Russia 
GP: Grand Prix; CS: Challenger Series; JGP: Junior Grand Prix

With Thauron for France

References

External links 

 

2000 births
French female ice dancers
Living people
People from Krasnoyarsk
Russian emigrants to France